Horatio Townshend (c. 1683–1751) was an English banker and politician who sat in the House of Commons between 1715 and 1734.

Townshend was the son of Horatio Townshend, 1st Viscount Townshend and his second wife Mary Ashe, daughter of Sir Joseph Ashe, 1st Baronet, and was educated at Eton College.

Townshend was Governor of the Bank of England from 1733 to 1735. He had been Deputy Governor from 1732 to 1733. He replaced Edward Bellamy as Governor and was succeeded by Bryan Benson. He was a Commissioner of the Victualling Board from 1747 to 1765.

See also
Chief Cashier of the Bank of England

References

External links

|-

|-

1680s births
1751 deaths
People educated at Eton College
Deputy Governors of the Bank of England
Governors of the Bank of England
Members of the Parliament of Great Britain for constituencies in Wiltshire
British MPs 1715–1722
British MPs 1727–1734